Ceroprepes walterzeissi is a species of snout moth in the genus Ceroprepes. It was described by Roesler, in 1983, and is known from Sumatra, Indonesia.

References

Moths described in 1983
Phycitinae